WMGZ (97.7 FM) is a radio station broadcasting a classic hits format. Licensed to Eatonton, Georgia, United States.  The station is currently owned by Southern Stone Broadcasting, Inc.

In March 2010, Z97 abandoned the ABC Radio format in order to provide a local radio format. Z97 featured local DJs on the air weekdays, 6am until 10pm.

History

The station was assigned the call letters WDJJ on 1987-04-14.  On 1987-12-17, the station changed its call sign to WSKS then on 1993-07-22 to the current WMGZ.

On July 5, 2016, WMGZ changed their format from hot adult contemporary to classic hits, branded as "97 Big FM".

On February 23, 2017, WMGZ began transmitting from their upgraded facilities in Lexington, Georgia.

Previous logo

References

External links

MGZ
Hot adult contemporary radio stations in the United States